Ilie Daniel Popescu (born 1 June 1983 in Reşiţa) is a Romanian-born former artistic gymnast. He is an Olympic Team bronze medallist (2004), a world silver medalist (2007/ vault) and a European bronze medalist (2008/ Pommel Horse). He changed his nationality to German. He coaches several teams of the German gymnastics club TV Schwäbisch Gmünd Wetzgau, for which he also starts in the German Gymnastics League.

References

External links
 
 
 

1983 births
Living people
Romanian male artistic gymnasts
Gymnasts at the 2004 Summer Olympics
Gymnasts at the 2008 Summer Olympics
Olympic gymnasts of Romania
Olympic bronze medalists for Romania
Medalists at the World Artistic Gymnastics Championships
Olympic medalists in gymnastics
Medalists at the 2004 Summer Olympics